Helios, more fully the Helios New Encyclopedic Dictionary ( or: Νεώτερον Εγκυκλοπαιδικόν Λεξικόν Ήλιος), is a general knowledge Greek encyclopaedia. Its publication commenced in 1945 while its second edition was completed in 1960, comprising 18 volumes.

See also
 List of Greek encyclopedias

Greek encyclopedias
20th-century encyclopedias
1945 non-fiction books
1960 non-fiction books